Gábor Bagoly (born 27 April 1973 in Nyíregyháza) is a Hungarian football (defender) player who currently plays for SC Neusiedl 1919.

External links
Player profile at HLSZ 

1973 births
Living people
People from Nyíregyháza
Hungarian footballers
Hungarian expatriate footballers
Association football defenders
Debreceni VSC players
Nyíregyháza Spartacus FC players
KCFC-Hajdúszoboszló footballers
Dunaújváros FC players
FC Sopron players
Expatriate footballers in Austria
SC Neusiedl 1919 players
Hungarian expatriate sportspeople in Austria
Sportspeople from Szabolcs-Szatmár-Bereg County